Donkeyhead is a 2021 Canadian comedy-drama film written and directed by Agam Darshi in her directorial debut. The plot follows Mona, a woman tasked with taking care of her father with the help of her three siblings after he is diagnosed with cancer and his health starts to deteriorate. The film premiered at the Mosaic International South Asian Film Festival in Mississauga, Ontario, on December 1, 2021. It was digitally released on Netflix on January 21, 2022. It received generally positive reviews from critics.

Premise
Mona is a failed writer who carves out a life of isolation while caring for her ailing Sikh father. When he suffers a debilitating stroke, her three successful siblings show up on her doorstep determined to take control of the situation.

Cast
 Agam Darshi as Mona
 Stephen Lobo
 Sandy Sidhu
 Husein Madhavji
 Kim Coates
 Marvin Ishmael
 Balinder Johal

Production
Filming began in Regina, Saskatchewan, on January 18, 2021, on a $2 million budget. Due to the COVID-19 pandemic, the film's crew had to follow various safety measures and protocols, such as getting tested frequently for the virus, practicing social distancing, and wearing facemasks while on set. According to co-producer Kelly Balon, the pandemic resulted in an additional $50,000 in production costs. Filming concluded after a month on February 12, after shooting scenes in various locations around the city, including at the Fat Badger, Hotel Saskatchewan, several funeral homes, and an old house at Victoria Avenue. Marian Wihak was the film's production designer.

Release
The film premiered at the Mosaic International South Asian Film Festival in Mississauga, Ontario, on December 1, 2021. It was theatrically released in Canada by Level Film and digitally by Super Channel. In the United States, the film was released by ARRAY and Netflix on January 21, 2022.

Reception
 Writing for the Los Angeles Times, Carlos Aguilar praised Darshi's performance and compared it to Anne Hathaway's role in Rachel Getting Married (2008). Beatrice Loayza from The New York Times criticized the screenplay and called the lead character "a stereotypically troubled woman whose eventual awakening merits a shrug at most." Aparita Bhandari of The Globe and Mail said, "Even if Darshi hasn't written Mona from personal experience, she clearly knows the character intimately, and gives Mona a kind of stubborn vulnerability that's totally relatable."

The film was shortlisted for Best Direction in a Feature Film at the 2022 Directors Guild of Canada awards.

References

External links
 

2021 films
2021 directorial debut films
2021 comedy-drama films
Canadian comedy-drama films
Canadian independent films
Films about cancer
Films about dysfunctional families
Films impacted by the COVID-19 pandemic
Films shot in Saskatchewan
Films about Indian Canadians
2020s English-language films
2020s Canadian films